= Villa Llao Llao =

Coordinates: 41°03′S 71°32′W

- Village
- Interactive map of Villa Llao Llao
- Country: Argentina
- Province: Río Negro Province
- Time zone: UTC−3 (ART)

Villa Llao Llao is a village belonging to the municipality of San Carlos de Bariloche in Bariloche department of Río Negro Province in Argentina.
